Licinus is a genus of ground beetles in the family Carabidae native to the Palearctic (including Europe), the Near East and North Africa. It contains the following species:

 Licinus aegyptiacus Dejean, 1826
 Licinus aequatus Audinet-Serville, 1821
 Licinus afghanistanus Jedlicka, 1967
 Licinus astrabadensis Reitter, 1902
 Licinus bartoni Maran, 1934
 Licinus cassideus (Fabricius, 1792) 
 Licinus convexus Heyden, 1889
 Licinus cordatus Chaudoir, 1861
 Licinus corustes Andrewes, 1932
 Licinus depressus Paykull, 1790
 Licinus hoffmannseggii (Panzer, 1803) 
 Licinus iranicus Jedlicka, 1968
 Licinus italicus Puel, 1925
 Licinus jaloricus Andrewes, 1927
 Licinus lindbergi Antoine, 1936
 Licinus manriquianus Wollaston, 1862
 Licinus merkli J. Frivaldszky, 1880
 Licinus mongolicus Reitter, 1900
 Licinus oblongus Dejean, 1826
 Licinus oertzeni Reitter, 1889
 Licinus peltoides Dejean, 1826
 Licinus planicollis Fauvel, 1888
 Licinus pubifer Reitter, 1897
 Licinus punctatulus (Fabricius, 1792) 
 Licinus schuberti Jedlicka, 1968
 Licinus setosus J.R. Sahlberg, 1880
 Licinus silphoides P. Rossi, 1790
 Licinus submarginatus J.R. Sahlberg, 1903
 Licinus yezoensis Habu, 1947

References

External links
Licinus at Fauna Europaea

Licininae